Myrmica lonae is a species of ant distributed across South, Central and North Europe, East Europe,  Asia Minor, the Caucasus, West Siberian Plain and Northern Kazakhstan. It inhabits humid  meadows both in the plains and in the mountains. It nests in the ground, under stones, or in moss. It forms polygynous colonies with up to 1000 workers or more.

References
 Csősz S, Markó B, Gallé L 2011. The myrmecofauna (Hymenoptera: Formicidae) of Hungary: an updated checklist North-Western Journal of Zoology 7: 55–62.
 Czekes Z et al. 2012. The genus Myrmica Latreille, 1804 (Hymenoptera: Formicidae) in Romania: distribution of species and key for their identification Entomologica romanica 17: 29–50.

External links

Hymenoptera of Europe
Myrmica
Insects described in 1926